Václav David (23 September 1910, Studený, Bohemia – 5 January 1996) was a Czechoslovak diplomat, he was Czechoslovak foreign minister from 31 January  1953 to 8 April 1968. He was also Chairman of the Chamber of People from 1971 to 1986.

See also
 List of Chairmen of the Chamber of the Nations (Czechoslovakia)
 List of Parliamentary Speakers in Europe in 1984
 Ministry of Foreign Affairs (Czechoslovakia)
 Viliam Široký
 Territorial evolution of Poland

References 

1910 births
1996 deaths
People from Benešov District
People from the Kingdom of Bohemia
Members of the Central Committee of the Communist Party of Czechoslovakia
Foreign ministers of Czechoslovakia
Government ministers of Czechoslovakia
Members of the Interim National Assembly of Czechoslovakia
Members of the Constituent National Assembly of Czechoslovakia
Members of the National Assembly of Czechoslovakia (1948–1954)
Members of the National Assembly of Czechoslovakia (1954–1960)
Members of the National Assembly of Czechoslovakia (1960–1964)
Members of the National Assembly of Czechoslovakia (1964–1968)
Members of the Chamber of the People of Czechoslovakia (1969–1971)
Members of the Chamber of the People of Czechoslovakia (1971–1976)
Members of the Chamber of the People of Czechoslovakia (1976–1981)
Members of the Chamber of the People of Czechoslovakia (1981–1986)
Members of the Chamber of the People of Czechoslovakia (1986–1990)
Czechoslovak diplomats
Czech communists